Yatala Tissa was an early monarch of Sri Lanka of the Kingdom of Ruhuna in the Southern region of the island. 
The Kingdom of Ruhuna was a Sub kingdom loyal to the King of Anuradhapura

See also
 List of monarchs of Sri Lanka
 List of Ruhuna monarchs

External links 
 Kings & Rulers of Sri Lanka
 Codrington's Short History of Ceylon

Anuradhapura period
Prince of Ruhuna